Anisul Haque Chowdhury was a Bangladesh Awami League politician and the former Member of Parliament of Rangpur-7 and Rangpur-2.

Career
Chowdhury was elected to parliament from Rangpur-7 as a Bangladesh Awami League candidate in 1973. He was elected to parliament from Rangpur-2 as a Bangladesh Awami League candidate in 1986. He was elected to parliament from Rangpur-2 as a Bangladesh Awami League candidate in 1996 by-election. He served as a State Minister.

Death
Chowdhury died on 11 January 2011 at Rangpur Medical College Hospital in Rangpur City, Bangladesh.

References

Awami League politicians
2011 deaths
3rd Jatiya Sangsad members
7th Jatiya Sangsad members
People from Rangpur District
1st Jatiya Sangsad members